Maham Tariq Magsi (born 5 July 1997) is a Pakistani cricketer who plays as a right-arm fast-medium bowler. She appeared in eight One Day Internationals and three Twenty20 Internationals for Pakistan between 2014 and 2017. She has also played domestic cricket for Karachi, Omar Associates, Zarai Taraqiati Bank Limited and State Bank of Pakistan.

After last playing for the Pakistan team in February 2017, she was named in Pakistan's squad for their series against the West Indies in June 2021. In October 2021, she was named in Pakistan's team for the 2021 Women's Cricket World Cup Qualifier tournament in Zimbabwe.

References

External links
 
 

1997 births
Living people
Cricketers from Karachi
Pakistani women cricketers
Pakistan women One Day International cricketers
Pakistan women Twenty20 International cricketers
Karachi women cricketers
Omar Associates women cricketers
Zarai Taraqiati Bank Limited women cricketers
State Bank of Pakistan women cricketers